George Willoughby (December 9, 1914 – January 5, 2010) was a Quaker activist who advocated for world peace, and conducted nonviolent protests against war and preparations for war.

Biography
Willoughby lived next to the Old Pine Farm Natural Land Trust in Deptford, Gloucester County, part of the New Jersey Green Acres program.  He was raised in the Panama Canal zone.

He met his wife, Lillian Willoughby, in Iowa in the 1930s.

He was a conscientious objector during World War II and helped find homes for Japanese-Americans who had been put in camps at the outbreak of the war.

He was involved with the Committee for Non-Violent Action (CNVA), formed in 1957 to resist the US Government's program of nuclear weapons testing, one of the first organizations to employ direct nonviolent action to protest against the nuclear arms race.

He was a crew member of the Golden Rule, a small boat that in 1958 sailed into the South Pacific to protest atomic testing there by the United States. With the other crew members, William R. Huntington, James Peck, Orion Sherwood, and skipper Albert Bigelow he was arrested  from Honolulu and sentenced to 60 days in jail. Their act of non-violent protest against the testing of nuclear arms and the nuclear arms race attracted worldwide media coverage and inspired similar actions by members of the Vancouver-based Don't Make a Wave Committee (which later became Greenpeace).

From 1971 to 1987, Willoughby and his wife were central to a group of 20 houses practicing communal living in West Philadelphia, called "The Life Center," devoted to helping the community. The Life Center was home to, and supported the activities of the Philadelphia branch of Movement for a New Society.

The Willoughbys lived in a small third-floor apartment where they practiced living simply. When a Philadelphia Daily News reporter encountered them there in June 1980, they were baking their own bread.

In 1981 he helped to start Peace Brigades International.

Taking on the simple life was also a way to keep any income away from the federal government. Even so, the IRS confiscated their red Volkswagen for back taxes. During the auction at the IRS headquarters in Chester in 1970, the Willoughbys and supporters served lemonade in the hallway before submitting the winning bid of $900 to buy the car back.

In 1992, George and Lillian Willoughby provided 30+ acres of undeveloped property along Big Timber Creek as the foundation of the Old Pine Farm Natural Lands Trust located in Deptford Township, NJ. Part of the New Jersey Green Acres Program, this open space has available to the public from dawn to dusk for more than 20 years.

Willoughby died on January 5, 2010. He was survived by three daughters, Sally Willowbee, Anita and Sharon Willoughby; a son, Alan Willoughby, and three grandchildren.

See also
 List of peace activists

References
A Biography of Lillian and George Willoughby: Twentieth-Century Quaker Peace Activists
George Willoughby's obituary at War Resisters International
Remembering George Willoughby, by Nonviolence.org's Martin Kelley
Philadelphia Daily News Obituary
Swarthmore College Peace Collection
History of Peace Brigades International

American tax resisters
1914 births
2010 deaths
People from Gloucester County, New Jersey
American Quakers
War Resisters League activists